The 2020 World Senior Curling Championships was scheduled to be held from April 18 to 25 in Kelowna, Canada. On March 14, 2020 the event was cancelled due to the COVID-19 pandemic. The event was scheduled to be held in conjunction with the 2020 World Mixed Doubles Curling Championship.

References

External links
Official website

World Senior Curling Championships
World Senior Curling
World Senior Curling Championship
International curling competitions hosted by Canada
World Senior Curling Championship
Curling